The 2011–12 Columbia Lions men's basketball team represented Columbia University during the 2011–12 NCAA Division I men's basketball season. The Lions, led by second year head coach Kyle Smith, played their home games at Levien Gymnasium as members of the Ivy League.

Roster

Schedule

|-
!colspan=9| Regular Season

|-
!colspan=9| Ivy League

References

Columbia Lions men's basketball seasons
Columbia
Lions
Lions